Euronesian is an umbrella term and portmanteau for people of mixed European and either Oceanians as "Polynesian", "Melanesian" or "Micronesian" descent. The term is most commonly used in Samoa and Fiji. Most Euronesians are descended from British or French colonizers, missionaries and traders and with some from Spaniards and Polynesians in Easter Island (where they are called mestizos by Chilean law) and from Spaniards and Micronesians in Guam, Northern Marianas, Marshall Islands, Caroline Islands, and Palau.
ʻAfakasi is the common turn of reference for euronesians in Samoa.

Distinct Euronesian groups include the Hawaiian Hapa haole, Tahitian demis, Ōbeikei Islanders, Pitcairn Islanders, Norfolk Islanders, and Palmerston Islanders.

See also
Austronesian peoples
Eurasian (mixed ancestry)
Europeans in Oceania
Indo people
Multiracial

References

Indigenous peoples of Polynesia
Ethnic groups in Oceania
European diaspora in Oceania
Multiracial affairs